KOTR-LD (channel 7) is a low-power television station licensed to Monterey, California, United States, serving as the MyNetworkTV affiliate for the Monterey Bay area.

History
Mirage Media acquired the broadcast license of K02DC, a translator of Monterey's NBC affiliate KSBW (channel 8) licensed to serve the Sycamore Flat area near Greenfield, California, from the Arroyo Seco Citizens Association. Shortly after the sale, the company applied to the Federal Communications Commission (FCC) to move the transmitter site to serve Gonzales and increase the effective radiated power from 44 watts to 3000 watts. On May 23, 2006, the station went silent pending construction of the new broadcast facilities.

On June 15, 2006, it was announced that KOTR-LP would become the MyNetworkTV affiliate for the Monterey–Salinas–Santa Cruz market.

On December 6, 2006, KOTR-LP began operation as cable channel 11 on Monterey County's Comcast system. The station launched over-the-air on April 9, 2007.

On March 6, 2018, it was reported that KOTR-LP's license in Santa Cruz was being sold to South Asian broadcaster Diya TV for $50,000. The station's programming and intellectual property would move to another station owned by Mirage Media.

Programming

News operation and syndicated programming
Until 2012, the station simulcast newscasts from fellow MyNetworkTV affiliate KRON-TV in San Francisco. Newscasts aired weekdays from 6–9 a.m., and at 5, 6 and 11 p.m., and weekends at 8 p.m. Paid programming has since replaced the newscasts.

Current syndicated programming includes American Ninja Warrior and Judge Mathis, among others.

Broadcast of San Francisco Giants games
KOTR-LD serves as the San Francisco Giants broadcast affiliate for mostly Friday night games carried on KNTV in the Bay Area rather than NBC Sports Bay Area.

Subchannels
The station's digital signal is multiplexed:

See also
Channel 7 digital TV stations in the United States
Channel 11 branded TV stations in the United States

References

External links
Official website
MyNetworkTV Adds 10 Affils from Adweek

MyNetworkTV affiliates
OTR-LD
Low-power television stations in the United States
Television channels and stations established in 2007